Dilip Sananda is an Indian politician who is a leader of the Indian National Congress and a former member of the Maharashtra Legislative Assembly from Buldhana. He was arrested by the police  in February 2016 on corruption charges. In March he was released from jail on bail.

References

Indian National Congress politicians
Maharashtra politicians
Living people
People from Buldhana district
Year of birth missing (living people)